The Bisha Fishing Port is a harbor and fish market in Zhongzheng District, Keelung, Taiwan.

Architecture
The port consists of two rectangular buildings, which are the fish market and food court. It also features the retired Haikung Boat which used to be used for sea research activities.

Destinations
The harbor serves as the departure point for Keelung Islet.

Transportation
The port is accessible by Keelung City Bus from Keelung Station of Taiwan Railways.

See also
 Fisheries Agency
 Badouzi Fishing Port
 Zhengbin Fishing Port

References

Ports and harbors of Keelung